The Mount Tom Station was a coal-fired power plant located in Holyoke, Massachusetts. It was the last coal-fired plant in Western Massachusetts before its closure in December 2014.

History

The plant was opened in 1960, and was briefly converted to run on oil for ten years after 1970, before returning to burning coal. Starting in 2009, it no longer became profitable to run the station except in times of high demand due to the natural gas boom in the United States. The boom has resulted in the price of coal growing relative to the price of natural gas which makes coal generation less competitive.

In 2014, GDF SUEZ Energy North America, the owner of the plant (via FirstLight Power Resources), announced that they would be closing the plant later that year citing economic concerns. The town of Holyoke plans to clean up and re-purpose the site in the future.

In October 2016 ground was broken at the site for the construction of a new solar farm.

See also

List of power stations in Massachusetts

References

External

Buildings and structures in Holyoke, Massachusetts
Coal-fired power stations in Massachusetts
Former coal-fired power stations in the United States
Former power stations in Massachusetts